Lily of the valley tree is a common name for several trees and may refer to:

 Clethra arborea, shrub or small tree native to Madeira in the family Clethraceae
 Crinodendron patagua, tree native to Chile in the family Elaeocarpaceae
 Oxydendrum arboreum, tree native to the southeastern United States in family Ericaceae

Trees